The Panorama of the Battle of Waterloo is a rotunda in Belgium that houses a monumental panoramic painting depicting the Battle of Waterloo. The neoclassical building is located immediately to the north of the Lion's Mound on the battlefield of the Battle of Waterloo in the municipality of Braine-l'Alleud in the Belgian province of Walloon Brabant.

Design 
The rotunda was designed by the architect  in 1911. The white painted brick walls of the rotunda are decorated with recessed blind arches separated by Ionic pilasters, and crowned with parapet with a frieze of palmettes. The entrance porch has two pairs of Tuscan columns supporting a triangular pediment. 

The painting depicts several different episodes from the Battle of Waterloo in 1815, concentrating on charges by French cavalry.  Physical elements in front of the painting, including cut-out figures, fences and bodies made of plaster and papier mache, disguise the lower edge of the painting and enhance its immersive quality.

The building and the painting were protected as historical monuments in 1998.  In 2008 the Belgian government proposed that the panorama should be included within a UNESCO World Heritage Site listing.

The Waterloo Panorama is one of few original panoramas that have survived and which are still exhibited in their original location.  Other panoramas of the Battle of Waterloo, by Charles Verlat,  Paul Philippoteaux and  have been lost.

See also
 List of Waterloo Battlefield locations

References

 Based on a translation of the French article
 Le Panorama de la Bataille de Waterloo, exemple particulièrement significatif de « Phénomène de Panoramas », UNESCO submission, 8 April 2008

Waterloo Battlefield locations
Buildings and structures in Walloon Brabant
Cycloramas
1912 paintings
Waterloo campaign in paintings
Buildings and structures completed in 1911
Neoclassical architecture in Belgium
Rotundas in Europe
Braine-l'Alleud
Horses in art